James Paton may refer to:

James Paton (bishop) (1522–1596), Bishop of Dunkeld, Scotland
James Paton (seaman) (1869–1917/18), Scottish-born seaman who sailed to the Antarctic
James Paton (Prince Edward Island politician) (1853–1953), Scottish-born merchant and political figure in Prince Edward Island
James Paton (sport shooter) (born 1957), Canadian sport shooter
James Alexander Paton (c. 1885–1946), newspaper owner and politician in British Columbia

See also 
James Patton (disambiguation)
James A. Patten (1852–1928), American financier and grain merchant